Ramón Darío Ocampo (born 21 June 1986) is an Argentine football midfielder currently playing for Club Guaraní in the Paraguayan Primera División.

Career

Ocampo made his debut for Vélez Sársfield on November 19, 2004. In 2009, he was part of the squad that won the Clausura championship, his second championship with the club.

In 2010, Ocampo joined defending Argentine Primera División champion Argentinos Juniors, on a free loan with option to buy from Vélez Sársfield.

Honours
Vélez Sársfield
Primera División Argentina (2): Clausura 2005, Clausura 2009

See also
 List of expatriate footballers in Paraguay
 Players and Records in Paraguayan Football

References

External links
 Futbol XXI Player Statistics
 Velez Sarsfield Official Player Profile

1986 births
Living people
Sportspeople from Misiones Province
Argentine footballers
Argentine expatriate footballers
Association football midfielders
Club Guaraní players
Club Atlético Vélez Sarsfield footballers
Rosario Central footballers
Argentinos Juniors footballers
Expatriate footballers in Paraguay
Argentine Primera División players